The Miss Guatemala 2007 pageant was held on April 1, 2007 at Auditorio Nacionalin the capital city Guatemala City, Guatemala. This year only 12 candidates were competing for the national crown. The chosen winner will represent Guatemala at the Miss Universe 2007 and at Miss Continente Americano 2007. The winner of best national costume, the costume was used in Miss Universe 2007. Miss World Guatemala entered at the Miss World 2007. Miss Guatemala Internacional entered  at the Miss International 2007. The Semifinalists entered Miss Intercontinental 2007 and Top Model of the World 2007.

The Miss Guatemala Internacional had injured her shoulder, disabling her from entering the Miss International pageant. The winner, Alida Boer took her spot.

Final Results

Special Awards
 Miss Photogenic – Hamy Tejada  (Ciudad Capital)
 Miss Congeniality (voted by the candidates) – María José Zavala  (Ciudad Capital)
 Best National Costume –  Hania Hernández  (Chiquimula)

Official Delegates

External links
Official Website

Miss Guatemala
2007 beauty pageants